Tamorley "Ziggy" Thomas (born 28 July 1983, in St. John's) is an Antiguan footballer who formerly played for Antigua Barracuda FC in the USL Professional Division.

Club career
Thomas played club football for Hoppers in the Antigua and Barbuda Premier Division from 2002 to 2010. He won the CTV Warriors' Cup with the Hoppers in 2005, and played in the CFU Club Championship in 2005 and 2006/07.

On April 8, 2011, Thomas signed with Antigua Barracuda FC in the USL Professional Division. He made his debut for the Barracudas on April 17, 2011, in the team's first competitive game, a 2–1 loss to the Los Angeles Blues, and had the honor of scoring his team's first ever competitive goal.

International career
Nicknamed Ziggy, Thomas made his debut for Antigua and Barbuda on  November 11, 2002, in CONCACAF Gold Cup qualification match against Haiti and has earned 15 caps since. He played in 7 World Cup qualification games.

National team statistics 
As of match played on 11 November 2016.

International goals
Scores and results list Antigua and Barbuda's goal tally first.

References

External links
 

1983 births
Living people
Antigua and Barbuda footballers
Antigua and Barbuda international footballers
Antigua Barracuda F.C. players
USL Championship players
2014 Caribbean Cup players
People from St. John's, Antigua and Barbuda
Association football midfielders